Kirschenmichel (other names include Kirschenplotzer, Kerschemischel, Kirschpfanne and Kirschenmännla) is a traditional dessert of German cuisine, especially popular in the regions Palatinate, Baden-Württemberg, South Bavaria, Franconia and the southern part of Hesse. It is kind of a pudding and similar to bread pudding and bread and butter pudding.

Description
The dessert consists of bread that is a few days old which is kneaded into a dough with butter, milk, egg and sugar. Sour cherries or sweet cherries are folded into the dough and the mixture is baked in a casserole dish. Prior to serving the dessert is topped with vanilla, cinnamon, almonds and clove and is then served hot with vanilla sauce.

Although traditionally a dessert, it can also be found as main dish after an appetizer soup.

A similar dish popular in the south of Germany is Ofenschlupfer which consists of layers of aged bread and apple slices (instead of cherries) which are then soaked in a mixture of butter, sugar and egg. Some also add raisins and serve it with hot vanilla sauce.

See also
 German cuisine
 Bread pudding
 Bread and butter pudding
 List of cherry dishes
 List of German desserts

References

German desserts
German puddings
Swabian cuisine
Fruit dishes
Cherry dishes